Oregocerata orcula is a species of moth of the family Tortricidae. It is found in Bolivia and Zamora-Chinchipe Province, Ecuador.

The forewings are greyish brown without distinct pattern elements.

References

Moths described in 1988
Euliini